Nishon District is a district of Qashqadaryo Region in Uzbekistan. The capital lies at Yangi Nishon. The district consists of two cities (Yangi Nishon and Tallimarjon), 9 urban-type settlements (Nuriston, Nishon, Guliston, Oq oltin, Sardoba, Paxtachi, Oydin, Samarqand, Paxtaobod) and 8 rural communities.

References

Qashqadaryo Region
Districts of Uzbekistan